Mohamed Ajmal Malik (born 28 July 1941) is a Kenyan field hockey player. He competed at the 1968 Summer Olympics and the 1972 Summer Olympics.

References

External links
 

1941 births
Living people
Kenyan male field hockey players
Olympic field hockey players of Kenya
Field hockey players at the 1968 Summer Olympics
Field hockey players at the 1972 Summer Olympics
Sportspeople from Nairobi
Kenyan people of Indian descent